Roe & Co Distillery is an Irish whiskey distillery established in 2019, owned by Diageo. It is located on Thomas Street, Dublin, Ireland near the Guinness' St. James' Gate brewery.

History
The Thomas Street Distillery, run by the Roe Family, was once the largest in the Britain and Ireland, with an output of two million gallons per annum at its peak. It was located opposite Guinness' St. James' Gate brewery. After the distillery was closed in 1926, some of its buildings were purchased and incorporated into the Guinness Brewery.

In January 2017, Diageo, producers of Guinness, announced that they would invest €25 million in establishing a new distillery in the old brewery power house building on Thomas Street, close to the site of the original Thomas Street Distillery. Production at the new distillery started in the first half of 2019.

Products
Diageo resurrected the original brand and launched a non-chill filtered, 45% ABV premium blended whiskey under the name "Roe & Co" in March 2017.

References

External links

Distilleries in the Republic of Ireland
Tourist attractions in Dublin (city)
Irish companies established in 2019